Comedy Central Family is a spin-off channel of Comedy Central in European countries:

Current channels 
Comedy Central Family (Hungarian TV channel), launched on 3 October 2017 replacing Comedy Central Extra

Closed channels 
Comedy Central Family (Dutch TV channel), closed on 31 May 2018
Comedy Central Family (Polish TV channel), rebranded as Polsat Comedy Central Extra on 3 March 2020